During the COVID-19 pandemic, FloWrestling managed to put on a list of events while the sport of freestyle wrestling was absent.

Background 
During the COVID-19 pandemic in the United States, amateur wrestling, known for being an active sport with multiple competitions in the USA, was forced to close down. The biggest promotions of different sports, such as the NFL and the NBA, were absent during this time, and so was FloWrestling.

Event list

Dake vs. Chamizo 

FloWrestling: Dake vs. Chamizo was an amateur wrestling event produced by FloWrestling that took place on July 25, 2020 at the Omni Austin at Southpark on Austin, Texas, United States.

Background

This event was the second major amateur wrestling event hosted in the United States during the COVID-19 pandemic after Rumble on the Rooftop. It was originally going to feature just three bouts, Kyle Dake vs. Frank Chamizo, David Taylor vs. Pat Downey and Anthony Ashnault vs. Luke Pletcher.

On July 6, Ashnault was forced to pull out of his bout against Pletcher after suffering an injury and was replaced by Darrion Caldwell on July 10.

On July 8 and 10 respectively, bouts between Roman Bravo-Young vs. Jack Mueller and Vitali Arujau vs. Sammy Alvarez were added to the card.

On July 12, the co-main event formed by David Taylor and Pat Downey fell apart after Downey had problems with the organization and withdrew from the card. He was replaced by Myles Martin on July 15.

Results

Flo 8-Man Challenge: 195 lbs 

The Flo 8-Man Challenge: 195 lbs was an amateur wrestling event produced by FloWrestling that took place on October 31, 2020, at the Omni Austin at Southpark on Austin, Texas, United States.

Background

This 195-pound prize tournament's pay-outs consisted on 20,000$ for the champion, 10,000$ for the runner-up, 5,000$ for the third-placer, 2,500$ for the fourth-placer and 1,000$ for the fifth to eight placer. It also featured two women's wrestling matches.

Results

Burroughs vs. Valencia 

FloWrestling: Burroughs vs. Valencia was an amateur wrestling event produced by FloWrestling that took place on November 14, 2020, at the Omni Austin at Southpark on Austin, Texas, United States.

Background

Samy Moustafa was scheduled to face Cohlton Schultz in a Greco-Roman match, however, the bout was scrapped later on.

Results

RTC Cup 

The FloWrestling: RTC Cup presented by Titan Mercury Wrestling Club was an amateur wrestling event produced by FloWrestling that took place on December 4–5, 2020, at the Omni Austin at Southpark on Austin, Texas, United States.

Background

This RTC Cup featured six top USA Regional Training Centers, with 200,000$ payouts on the line.

Pool A

Pool B

Bracket and medal matches

Flo 8-Man Challenge: 150 lbs 

The Flo 8-Man Challenge: 150 lbs was an amateur wrestling event produced by FloWrestling that took place on December 18, 2020, at the Omni Austin at Southpark on Austin, Texas, United States.

Background

This 150-pound prize tournament's pay-outs consisted on 25,000$ for the champion, 15,000$ for the runner-up, 10,000$ for the third-placer, 5,000$ for the fourth-placer and 1,000$ for the fifth to eight placer.

Brackets

SCRTC I 

The SCRTC I was an amateur wrestling event produced by the Spartan Combat Regional Training Center and FloWrestling that took place on January 8, 2021, at the Omni Austin at Southpark on Austin, Texas, United States.

Results

Mensah-Stock vs. Gray 

FloWrestling: Mensah-Stock vs. Gray (originally FloWrestling: Burroughs vs. Taylor) was an amateur wrestling event produced by FloWrestling that took place on January 9, 2021, at the Omni Austin at Southpark on Austin, Texas, United States. The headliner was scheduled to be a showdown between five-time World and Olympic champion Jordan Burroughs and '18 World Champion David Taylor, however, the bout was postponed, and what was the co-main event ('19 World Champion Tamyra Mensah-Stock vs. five-time World Champion Adeline Gray) was moved to the main event.

Results

Burroughs vs. Taylor 

FloWrestling: Burroughs vs. Taylor was an amateur wrestling event produced by FloWrestling that took place on January 13, 2021, at an unknown venue on Lincoln, Nebraska, United States.

Background

Originally the headliner for FloWrestling: Mensah-Stock vs. Gray, the match between five-time World and Olympic champion Jordan Burroughs and '18 World Champion David Taylor was scratched from the card on January 8, after Taylor was unable to travel to Austin, Texas due to COVID-19 restrictions, thus postponing the event for four days later and changing the location to Lincoln, Nebraska.

Results

References 

Amateur wrestling
Wrestling
Freestyle wrestling
Greco-Roman wrestling
Recurring sporting events established in 2020
Sporting events in the United States
Sports in Austin, Texas
Sports in Texas